Mons is used as a surname and a masculine given name. People with the name include:

Surname

 Anna Mons (1672-1714), mistress of Tsar Peter I of Russia
 Chloé Mons (born 1972), French actress and singer
 Evgeny Mons (born 1989), Russian ice hockey player
 Modesta Mons (Matryona Balk,  1718), confidante of Empress-Consort Catherine of Russia
 Pascal Mons, French rugby player
 W. E. R. Mons (1897–1984), British psychiatrist
 Willem Mons (1688–1724), courtier in Saint Petersburg

Given name
 Mons Bassouamina (born 1998), Congolese football player
 Mons Espelid (1926–2009), Norwegian politician
 Mons Haukeland (1892–1983), Norwegian gymnastics teacher and military officer
 Mons Kallentoft (born 1968), Swedish author and journalist
 Mons A. Kårbø (1881–1964), Norwegian politician
 Mons Lid (1896–1967), Norwegian politician 
 Mons Lie (1757–1827), Norwegian police chief and writer
 Mons Lie (writer) (1864–1931), Norwegian writer
 Mons Monssen (1867–1930), American sailor of Norwegian origin
 Mons Røisland (born 1997), Norwegian snowboarder

See also
 Mons family, Dutch family
 Mons (disambiguation)
 Gislebert of Mons (c. 1150 – 1225), clergyman in the County of Hainaut 

Swedish masculine given names
Dutch-language surnames
Norwegian masculine given names